Nathaniel Pierce Blish Jr., known professionally as Nat Pierce (July 16, 1925 – June 10, 1992) was an American jazz pianist and prolific composer and arranger, perhaps best known for being pianist and arranger for the Woody Herman band from 1951 to 1955. Pieces by Pierce were predominantly created for use in big bands.

Biography
Pierce was born in Somerville, Massachusetts. United States. Following schooling at the New England Conservatory and working as an amateur musician in the Boston area, Pierce then led his own band which featured Charlie Mariano from 1949 to 1951. After working with Woody Herman from 1951 to 1966 as chief arranger and assistant road manager, Pierce took residence in New York City and freelanced with musicians such as Pee Wee Russell, Lester Young, Emmett Berry and Ruby Braff.

From 1957 to 1959, Pierce led a band off and on which featured Buck Clayton, Gus Johnson and Paul Quinichette. He recorded with a number of other well-known musicians as well, including Quincy Jones, Coleman Hawkins and Pee Wee Russell. Pierce was noted for his ability to play piano in the Basie style and appeared on many releases by Basie sidemen. Pierce also arranged the music for The Sound of Jazz, a 1954 CBS television special hosted by John Crosby. Together with Frank Capp he founded the Capp/Pierce Juggernaut Band in 1975, which performed in to the 1990s.

Pierce died of complications from an abdominal infection in Los Angeles, California.

Discography

As leader
As Nat Pierce and His Orchestra
Kansas City Memories (Coral, 1957)
The Nat Pierce Orchestra – Big Band At The Savoy  (RCA, 1958)

With Frank Capp
Frank Capp & Nat Pierce: Juggernaut (Concord Jazz, 1976)
The Capp-Pierce Juggernaut: Live at the Century Plaza with Joe Williams (Concord Jazz, 1978)
 The Frank Capp-Nat Pierce Orchestra: Juggernaut Strikes Again! with Ernie Andrews (Concord Jazz, 1982)
The Capp-Pierce Juggernaut: Live at the Alley Cat with Ernestine Anderson (Concord Jazz, 1987)

As sideman
With Louis Bellson
Drummer's Holiday (Verve, 1958)
 The Louis Bellson Explosion (Pablo, 1975)
With Ruby Braff
The Ruby Braff Octet with Pee Wee Russell & Bobby Henderson at Newport (Verve, 1957)
With Benny Carter
'Live and Well in Japan! (Pablo Live, 1978)
With Al Cohn
The Natural Seven (RCA Victor, 1955)
With Freddie Green
Mr. Rhythm (RCA Victor, 1955)
With Coleman Hawkins
The Saxophone Section (World Wide, 1958)
Jazz Reunion (Candid, 1961) with Pee Wee Russell
With Johnny Hodges
Triple Play (RCA Victor, 1967)
With Joe Newman
All I Wanna Do Is Swing (RCA Victor, 1955)
Salute to Satch (RCA Victor, 1956)
Counting Five in Sweden (Metronome, 1958)
With Specs Powell
Movin' In (Roulette, 1957)
With Paul Quinichette
For Basie (Prestige, 1957)
Basie Reunion (Prestige, 1958)
Like Basie! (United Artists, 1959)
With Buddy Tate
Unbroken (MPS, 1970)
With Eddie "Cleanhead" Vinson
Clean Head's Back in Town (Bethlehem, 1957)

As arranger
With Count Basie
The Count! (Clef, 1952 [1955])
Dance Session Album #2 (Clef, 1954)
With Bob Brookmeyer
Kansas City Revisited (United Artists, 1958)
With Woody Herman
Woody Herman–1963 (Philips, 1963)
With Quincy Jones
The Birth of a Band! (Mercury, 1959)

References

External links

Progressive big band musicians
Big band bandleaders
Big band pianists
Bebop pianists
Swing pianists
American jazz pianists
American male pianists
1925 births
1992 deaths
Musicians from Somerville, Massachusetts
20th-century American pianists
Jazz musicians from Massachusetts
20th-century American male musicians
American male jazz musicians
The Capp-Pierce Juggernaut members